College Park is a city in Fulton and Clayton counties, Georgia, United States, adjacent to the southern boundary of the city of Atlanta. As of the 2020 census, the population was 13,930. Hartsfield–Jackson Atlanta International Airport is partially located in the city's boundaries (including the domestic terminal, Concourse T, Concourse A, and about two-thirds of Concourse B), and the Georgia International Convention Center, owned and operated by the City of College Park, is within the city limits. The city is home to the fourth-largest urban historical district registered with the National Register of Historic Places in the state of Georgia. The city is also home to the Gateway Center Arena, home of the College Park Skyhawks and Atlanta Dream.

Geography
College Park is located on the border of Fulton and Clayton counties at  (33.648209, -84.456007).

Infrastructure
Interstate 85 passes through the city and merges with Interstate 285, the perimeter highway around Atlanta, for a short distance in the southern part of College Park. I-85 exits 69 through 72 and I-285 exits 60 and 62 are located within the College Park city limits. The western part of Hartsfield–Jackson Airport, including its domestic terminal, is within the eastern side of the city.

Transit systems
The Metropolitan Atlanta Rapid Transit Authority (MARTA) provides heavy rail and bus services in College Park.

Metro
The College Park Station is the primary station for College Park, located within Downtown, and is the third busiest station in the MARTA Rail System, with a weekday average of 9,023 entries. It is serviced by both the Gold Line and the Red Line during the day, and only the Gold Line after 9:00 PM.

Buses
The following bus routes serve College Park:
Route 82 - Camp Creek / Welcome All
Route 84 - East Point/Camp Creek (leaves via the East Point Station)
Route 89 - Old National Hwy./Union City
Route 172 - Sylvan Road/Virginia Ave.
Route 180 - Fairburn / Palmetto
Route 181 - Buffington Rd./South Fulton P/R
Route 189 - Flat Shoals Road/ Scofield Road
Route 195 - Forest Parkway/Roosevelt Highway
Route 196 - Church/Upper Riv./Mt. Zion

History

19th century

The community that would become College Park was founded as Atlantic City in 1890 as a depot on the Atlanta and West Point Railroad. The town was renamed Manchester when it was incorporated as a city in 1891. It was renamed again as the city of College Park in 1896. The city's name came from being the home of Cox College (where the city hall and other buildings now stand) and Georgia Military Academy (now the Woodward Academy). The east-west avenues in College Park are named for Ivy League colleges, and the north-south streets are named for influential College Park residents.

20th century

During World War I, the name of "Wilhelm Street" was changed to "Victoria street" in "solidarity with our British brethren." At the same time "Berlin Avenue" was changed to "Cambridge Avenue" and the name of "German Lane" was changed to "English Lane." The history of College Park has been closely linked with what is now known as Hartsfield–Jackson Atlanta International Airport — airport development having spurred several radical changes to the landscape of the municipality over the course of the 20th century. In 1966, a study funded by the Department of Housing and Urban Development suggested that the introduction and expansion of jet aircraft travel would place the airport and surrounding communities, including College Park, into conflict; ultimately, the study concluded that "the only effective way to control the use of land is to own it," suggesting that the airport would have to acquire the properties it would be in conflict with in order to expand.

In the 1970s and 1980s, large swaths of property in College Park were purchased using information detailed in The Hartsfield-Jackson Atlanta International Airport Noise Land Reuse Plan, which allowed the airport to apply for federal funding to purchase property deemed to be in so-called "noise land." The 1985 Chuck Norris film Invasion U.S.A. was notoriously filmed in these abandoned portions of College Park; houses owned by the City of Atlanta and the FAA were allowed to be blown up to simulate bazooka attacks, a decision that has faced modern day criticism due to the fact that nearby properties were still in the process of being purchased. This site would eventually, in 2003, in part be home to the Georgia International Convention Center; the center officially opened in 1985 at a separate location, but was relocated to the area in response to planned airport runway expansions. Today, the GICC is the second largest convention center in Georgia, featuring a carpeted ballroom and multiple spaces for meetings, conferences and conventions. It is the only convention center in the country that also houses a SkyTrain with direct rail access to an international airport. Directly next to the Georgia International Convention Center is the Gateway Center Arena, which opened in November 2019, home to the NBA's G-League College Park Skyhawks and where the WNBA's Atlanta Dream will play their 2020 season.

In 1978, the College Park Historical Society was founded in order to combat proposed northward expansion of the airport; the society succeeded in lobbying against proposed flight paths over the neighborhood colloquially known as Historic College Park, as well as registered swaths of homes and the Main Street commercial district with the National Register of Historic Places, eventually resulting in the establishment of the College Park Historic District.

Between the 1980s and the early 2000s, as part of continued execution of the FAA noise abatement program, the City of Atlanta and the FAA purchased roughly 320 acres of property (containing residential structures, churches, and some small commercial buildings) immediately adjacent to the west side of downtown College Park, resulting in a multitude of properties sitting abandoned for decades. The totality of these eventually abandoned properties purchased between the 1970s and the 2000s have been described as a major player in shaping a negative public image of the city, second only to the perception of crime in the area.

Recent history

Hip hop
Although the Atlanta hip hop music scene in the 1980s and 1990s was largely credited to artists from nearby suburban Decatur, College Park and the adjacent city of East Point have been strongly associated with artists and record producers from "SWATS" ("Southwest Atlanta, Too Strong"), who have substantially contributed to the evolution of the southern hip hop genre over the course of the 2000s.

Gentrification
While the controversial process of gentrification started in the larger Atlanta Metropolitan Area in the 1970s, it was only in the latter 2010s that redevelopment substantially spread to College Park proper. In 2016, the College Park government embarked on a 20-year development plan which included goals "to expand its economic base while keeping its small town historic characteristics," and to "make use of its available land to attract new employers and residential opportunities." 2017 saw the construction of a mixed-use project which contained the first mid-rise apartments to be constructed in the city since 1969. From the 1990s and into the 2010s, the City of College Park succeeded in repurchasing the entirety of the 320 acres adjacent to downtown; in 2018, concurrent with substantial commercial and residential development in the area, the City of College Park announced major redevelopment of this abandoned area, now referred to as "Airport City," as part of a larger transit-oriented revitalization plan referred to as "Aerotropolis."

Historic district

The city center is part of the College Park Historic District, a 606-acre historic district listed with the National Register of Historic Places. According to the federal agency, the district contains 853 recognized historical resources constructed in the late 19th and early 20th centuries.

The majority of the 852 historic structures are homes of the Queen Anne style, various Late 19th and 20th Century Revivals, and bungalows of the American Craftsman style, all dating from 1882 to 1946. Other major historical structures include: The College Park Woman's Clubhouse at Camellia Hall (1927); the College Park First United Methodist Church (1904); a United States Postal Service Office (1937); four schools (constructed between 1914 and 1942); and the College Park Depot (pre-1900), part of the Atlanta & West Point Railroad.

Recreation 

College Park has four public recreation facilities: the Wayman & Bessie Brady Recreation Center, named in honor of its first Coordinators; the Hugh C. Conley Recreation Center, named in honor of a former Mayor Pro-Tem; the Tracey Wyatt Recreation Complex, named in honor of the previous Ward III Councilperson, Tracey Wyatt; and the College Park City Auditorium.

The city has four parks: Barrett Park, which is located along Rugby Avenue; Brenningham Park, which surrounds the Brady Center; Jamestown Park; and Richard D. Zupp Park.

College Park is home to the College Park Municipal Golf Course, a nine-hole course established in 1929.

In February 2018, development began on the Gateway Center Arena, a 5,000 seat multipurpose arena intended for public use, as well as to host the Atlanta Hawks NBA G League team, the College Park SkyHawks.

Demographics

2020 census

As of the 2020 United States census, there were 13,930 people, 5,861 households, and 2,911 families residing in the city.

2010 census
At the time of the 2010 census, there were 13,942 people, 5,595 households, and 3,208 families residing in the city. The racial makeup of the city was 81.1% Black, 14.1% White, 1.2% Native American, 1.1% Asian, 4.7% from other races, and 2.0% from two or more races. Hispanic or Latino people of any race were 6.9% of the population.

Population decline, 2000-2010
Between 2000 and 2010, College Park saw a 31.6% reduction in their population. The city government has suggested that this was due to the combined effects of airport expansion and the difficult nature of having housing constructed in areas previously considered to be "high noise."

Government and politics
The city of College Park is governed by a mayor and four council members. The current mayor is Bianca Motley Broom, the first female, African American mayor for the City, and the council members are: Ward 1, Ambrose Clay; Ward 2, Joe Carn; Ward 3, Ken Allen; and Ward 4, Roderick Gay.

The mayor is elected at-large, on a nonpartisan basis, for 4 year terms. The incumbent mayor, Bianca Motley Broom, has held the office since 2020.

Four council members are elected on a nonpartisan basis for 4 year terms, and each represents one of the four wards that make up the city. Legislative authority is placed in the city council, wherein each member is afforded one vote; the mayor oversees the deliberations of the council and is only entitled to a vote in the case of a tie.

Crime
For much of the 2000s, College Park – along with the other so-called Tri-Cities, East Point and Hapeville – has been popularly associated with crime; for example, a comedy/travel book originally published in 2005 describes College Park as "a nightmarish southern ghetto." Over the course of the 2010s, this reputation has been publicly challenged in the media, by Tri-Cities residents, and by the College Park Police Department.

The Federal Bureau of Investigation's annual Uniform Crime Report reveals that the College Park Police Department has historically reported a high crime rate per 100,000 persons as compared to other US jurisdictions. In 2008, College Park had one of the highest crime rates in Georgia, with reports including 13 homicides. However, 2008 was an outlier with respect to the rest of that decade and homicide; for the rest of the years between 2000 and 2010, between 1 and 3 homicides were reported annually. Further, it has been suggested that crime rate per 100,000 persons misrepresents the prevalence of crime, as College Park's daytime population is thought to swell to 50,000 persons (substantially more than the ~15,000 permanent residents considered in crime statistics).

The Uniform Crime Report and data released by the College Park Police Department suggests that the 2010s have brought a substantial decline in total crime, particularly in the latter half; in 2018, a total of 1,225 crimes were reported (compared to 2,695 in 2001, 2,530 in 2010, and 1,387 in 2017), 85% of which were property crimes. In 2018, there was a 13 percent decrease in Part I crimes and zero homicides as compared to 2017, following a 15 percent decrease from 2016 to 2017.

Economy

Chick-fil-A, a fast-food chicken chain, is headquartered in College Park. Atlantic Southeast Airlines had its headquarters in College Park until December 31, 2011; its final headquarters facility was a hangar at Hartsfield-Jackson Atlanta International Airport.

As of the 2016 American Community Survey, 35.7% of College Park residents are predicted to live in poverty.

In November 2019, The Gateway Center Arena @ College Park opened to the public, home to the College Park Skyhawks - the NBA G-League affiliate of the Atlanta Hawks - and the WNBA's Atlanta Dream. In addition, the Arena has an exclusive booking partnership with The Fox Theater.

Top employers
According to College Park's 2017 Comprehensive Annual Financial Report, the top employers in the city are:

Education

Primary and secondary schools

Fulton County
Residential areas within College Park are served by the Fulton County School System.

College Park Elementary School is in the city limits. Other schools serving sections of College Park with residences include the following: Heritage, Asa G. Hilliard in East Point, and Parklane Elementary School in East Point. Zoned middle schools serving College Park include and Paul D. West Middle School and Woodland Middle School, both in East Point.

There is also Main Street Academy, an unzoned charter K-8 school, located in College Park. Since 2016 it has occupied the former Harriet Tubman Elementary School.

Benjamin Banneker High School, in an unincorporated area, and Tri-Cities High School in East Point, both serve sections of College Park. Frank S. McClarin Alternative High School is located in College Park.

Clayton County
The section in Clayton County is served by Clayton County Public Schools.

G.W. Northcutt Elementary School and North Clayton Middle School are nearby for Clayton County residents.

Private schools
Woodward Academy is located in College Park. Woodward Academy is one of the most prominent non-residential private schools in the continental United States.

Public libraries
Atlanta-Fulton Public Library System operates the College Park Branch.

Notable people

 Dwight Howard, NBA all-star, 3 x Defensive Player of the year
 2 Chainz, rapper
 Morgan Burnett, safety for the Pittsburgh Steelers
 Kandi Burruss, member of the singing quartet Xscape
 Tameka Cottle, member of singing quartet Xscape and wife of rapper T.I.
 Bill Curry, football coach and analyst, former head coach for Georgia State University
 Creflo Dollar, teacher, pastor, and founder of World Changers Church International
 Jermaine Dupri, rapper, songwriter, record producer
 Keyaron Fox, Pittsburgh Steelers
 Kap G, rapper
 Gunna, rapper
 Trinidad James, rapper
 Jonas Jennings, Director of Player Development for the Georgia Bulldogs
 Ludacris, rapper
 Margaret Martin, professional bodybuilder
 Mr. Collipark, record producer
 Monica, R&B singer
 Cam Newton, professional football player, 2015 NFL MVP Carolina Panthers
 OG Maco, rapper
 Playaz Circle, rap group
 Ralph Presley, airline pilot, politician, and mayor of College Park
 Rich the Kid, rapper
 LaTocha Scott, member of singing quartet Xscape
 Tamika Scott, member of singing quartet Xscape
 Josh Smith, professional basketball player
 Fletcher Thompson, politician
 Turbo, record producer
 V.I.C., rapper
 Yung Joc, rapper

See also 
 Atlanta

References

External links

 City of College Park official website
 Historic College Park Neighborhood Association
 Georgia International Convention Center
 College Park Recreation Department

 
Cities in Georgia (U.S. state)
Cities in Clayton County, Georgia
Cities in Fulton County, Georgia
Cities in the Atlanta metropolitan area